Soper is an occupational surname for a soaper.

It may refer to:

People
 Donald Soper, Baron Soper (1903–1998), British Methodist minister, socialist and pacifist
 Fred E. Soper (1854–1930), American politician
 George Soper (1870–1948), American sanitation engineer
 George Soper (illustrator) (1870–1942), British illustrator and etcher
 John Harris Soper (1846–1944), marshall of the Kingdom of Hawaii
 Kate Soper (born 1943), British philosopher
 Kate Soper (composer) (born 1981), American composer
 Lesley Soper (born 1954), New Zealand politician
 Matt Soper, American politician
 Steve Soper (born 1951), British racing driver
 Tony Soper (born 1929), British naturalist, author and broadcaster
 J. Dewey Soper (1893–1982), Canadian explorer/ornithologist
 Lyle Soper (born 1990), Heavy Equipment Operator

Places
 Soper, Burkina Faso
 Soper, Michigan, ghost town
 Soper, Oklahoma, US
 Dewey Soper Migratory Bird Sanctuary, Baffin Island, Nunavut, Canada
 Soper Lake, Baffin Island, Nunavut, Canada
 Soper River, Baffin Island, Nunavut, Canada

Other

 Soper finds redirects to Michigan relics, archaeological fakes in Michigan

Occupational surnames
English-language occupational surnames